Johnson is an unincorporated community in Sussex County, Delaware, United States. Johnson is located on Delaware Route 20, northwest of Fenwick Island.

References

Unincorporated communities in Sussex County, Delaware
Unincorporated communities in Delaware